Bethanie Mattek and Vladimíra Uhlířová were the defending champions, but Uhlířová chose not to participate this year, and only Mattek competed this year. She played alongside Nadia Petrova but lost in the Quarterfinals to Chuang Chia-jung and Sania Mirza.

Chuang and Mirza reached the final where they beat Květa Peschke and Lisa Raymond to win their title.

Seeds

Draw

Finals

External links
 ITF tournament edition details

MPS Group Championships - Doubles
Doubles